Victorellidae is a family of bryozoans belonging to the order Ctenostomatida.

Genera:
 Bulbella Braem, 1951
 Sineportella Wood & Marsh, 1996
 Tanganella Braem, 1951
 Victorella Saville-Kent, 1870

References

Ctenostomatida
Bryozoan families